Mexico competed at the 1960 Summer Olympics in Rome, Italy. 69 competitors, 63 men and 6 women, took part in 54 events in 14 sports.

Medalists

Athletics

Men
Track & road events

Field events

Combined events – Decathlon

Women
Track & road events

Basketball

Boxing

Cycling

Ten cyclists, all men, represented Mexico in 1960.

Individual road race
 Luis Zárate
 Jacinto Brito
 Mauricio Mata
 Filiberto Mercado

Team time trial
 Armando Martínez
 Filiberto Mercado
 Luis Zárate

Sprint
 Cenobio Ruiz
 Luis Muciño

1000m time trial
 Mauricio Mata

Tandem
 Luis Muciño
 José Luis Tellez

Team pursuit
 Mauricio Mata
 Javier Taboada
 Jacinto Brito
 Miguel Pérez

Diving

Fencing

Eight fencers, seven men and one woman, represented Mexico in 1960.

Men's foil
 Raúl Cicero
 William Fajardo

Men's épée
 Antonio Almada
 Benito Ramos
 Ángel Roldán

Men's team épée
 Benito Ramos, Ángel Roldán, Antonio Almada, Sergio Escobedo, José Pérez

Men's sabre
 Benito Ramos
 William Fajardo

Women's foil
 Pilar Roldán

Gymnastics

Modern pentathlon

Three male pentathletes represented Mexico in 1960.

Individual
 Antonio Almada
 Sergio Escobedo
 José Pérez

Team
 Antonio Almada
 Sergio Escobedo
 José Pérez

Rowing

Mexico had two male rowers participate in one out of seven rowing events in 1960.

 Men's coxless pair
 Arcadio Padilla
 Roberto Retolaza

Sailing

Shooting

Six shooters represented Mexico in 1960.

25 m pistol
 Luis Jiménez
 Héctor Elizondo

50 m pistol
 Raúl Ibarra
 Ignacio Mendoza

50 m rifle, prone
 Paulino Díaz
 Ernesto Montemayor, Jr.

Swimming

Weightlifting

Wrestling

References

External links
Official Olympic Reports
International Olympic Committee results database

Nations at the 1960 Summer Olympics
1960
1960 in Mexican sports